Anthony Alexander Alam (23 February 1896 – 9 August 1983) was an Australian businessman, politician and philanthropist. He was one of the longest-serving members of the New South Wales Legislative Council, and a prominent member of the Lebanese community.

Biography

Early life
Alam was born on 23 January 1896 in Wallsend. His parents were immigrant Lebanese storekeepers, Joseph Alam and Mary née Hashem. He was educated at De La Salle College Armidale. He married Therese Anthony (daughter of W. Anthony) at St. Columbia's Church, Charters Towers, Queensland, on 26 April 1924.

Political career
He was an active in the Labor Party, and served as president of that Party's Gwydir, Dubbo and Wammerawa branches. He represented Labor in the New South Wales Legislative Council from 21 December 1925 until 22 April 1958, when he retired from that position. He later filled a casual vacancy caused by the resignation of Ian Sinclair from 19 November 1963 until 22 April 1973, when he again retired. He was therefore an MLC for over forty-one years. In doing so, he was one of the very earliest people with Asian ancestry to be represented in any Australian legislature.

Honours
He was appointed to the National Order of the Cedar (Lebanon), the Order of Nichan Iftikhar, the Légion d’honneur (France) and the Order of the Phoenix (Greece).

Death

References

1896 births
1983 deaths
Australian people of Lebanese descent
Lebanese Maronites
Australian Maronites
Australian Labor Party members of the Parliament of New South Wales
Members of the New South Wales Legislative Council
Recipients of the National Order of the Cedar
Recipients of the Legion of Honour
Recipients of the Order of the Phoenix (Greece)
20th-century Australian politicians
20th-century Australian philanthropists